Penile subincision is a form of genital modification or mutilation consisting of a urethrotomy, in which the underside of the penis is incised and the urethra slit open lengthwise, from the urethral opening (meatus) toward the base. The slit can be of varying lengths.

Subincision was traditionally performed around the world, notably in Australia, but also in Africa, South America and the Polynesian and Melanesian cultures of the Pacific, often as a coming of age ritual.

Disadvantages include the risks inherent in the procedure itself, which is often self-performed, and increased susceptibility to sexually transmitted infections (STIs). The ability to impregnate (specifically, getting sperm into the vagina) may also be decreased.

Subincisions can greatly affect urination, often resulting in hypospadias requiring the subincised male to sit or squat while urinating. The scrotum can be pulled up against the open urethra to quasi-complete the tube and allow an approximation to normal urination, while a few subincised men carry a tube with which they can aim.

Cultural traditions

Subincision (like circumcision) is well documented among the peoples of the central desert of Australia such as the Arrernte and Luritja. The Arrernte word for subincision is arilta, and occurs as a rite of passage ritual for adolescent boys.  It was given to the Arrernte by Mangar-kunjer-kunja, a lizard-man spirit being from the Dreamtime. Some academics theorise that a subincised penis is thought to resemble a vulva, and the bleeding is likened to menstruation. This type of modification of the penis was also traditionally performed by the Lardil people of Mornington Island, Queensland. The young men who underwent the procedure were the only ones to learn a simple ceremonial language, Damin. In later ceremonies, repeated throughout adult life, the subincised penis would be used as a site for ritual bloodletting. According to Ken Hale, who studied Damin, no ritual initiations have been carried out in the Gulf of Carpentaria for half a century, and hence the language has also died out.

Another indigenous Australian term for the custom is mika or the terrible rite.

Indigenous cultures of the Amazon Basin also practise subincision, as do Samburu herdboys of Kenya, who are said to perform subincisions on themselves (or sometimes their peers) at age seven to ten. In Samoa, subincision of the foreskin, skin located along the tip of the penis, was ritually performed upon young men, as in Hawaii, where subincision of the foreskin is reported to have been performed at age six or seven.

See also
 Meatotomy
 Modern primitive
 Body modification

References

Further reading
General
 
 Bettelheim, Bruno (1962) Symbolic Wounds: Puberty Rites and the Envious Male. New York: Collier.
 Farb, Peter (1968) Man's Rise to Civilization New York: E. P. Dutton p98-101.
Polynesia
 Firth, Raymond, (1963) We the Tikopia: A Sociological Study of Kinship in Primitive Polynesia. Boston: Beacon.
 Martin, John (1981) Tonga Islands: William Mariner’s Account. Tonga: Vava’u Press.
 Diamond, M. (1990) Selected Cross-Generational Sexual Behavior in Traditional Hawai’i: A Sexological Ethnography, in Feierman, J. R. (Ed.) Pedophilia: Biosocial Dimensions. New York: Springer-Verlag, p422-43
Melanesia
 
 Hogbin, Ian (1970) The Island of Menstruating Men: Religion in Wogeo, New Guinea. Prospect Heights, IL: Waveland
Australia
 
 
 
 Montagu, Ashley (1974) Coming into Being among the Australian Aborigines: The Procreative Beliefs of the Australian Aborigines. 2nd ed. London: Routledge and Kegan Paul.
 
 Abley, Mark. Spoken Here: Travels Among Threatened Languages.
Africa

External links

 Commons.wikimedia.org (Warning: shows picture)
 A mention of penile subincision in Hawaii during the early Twentieth Century
 A mention of penile subincision among Papuans 
 Rickharrison.com
 "The story of my subincision" at Kuro5hin.org

DIY culture
Male genital modification
Hawaii culture
Human male reproductive system
Indigenous Australian culture
Kenyan culture
Melanesian culture
Human penis
Samoan culture
South American culture
Urologic surgery